Rocket Girl is a London-based independent record label. It has released records by Robin Guthrie, Pieter Nooten, God Is an Astronaut, Ulrich Schnauss, A Place to Bury Strangers, Bell Gardens among others, including many artists associated with ambient music.

History 
Before launching Rocket Girl in 1997, Vinita Joshi had been actively involved in running both Cheree Records and Ché Trading, releasing tracks by artists such as The Telescopes, The Tindersticks, Bark Psychosis and Disco Inferno. Ché Trading, an offshoot label co-founded by Joshi and Nick Allport, was responsible for releasing the music of Essex Etherealists, Disco Inferno, and had a roster that also included the Tindersticks, Backwater, Füxa and Slipstream. Ché Trading had two Top 40 hit singles by Lilys ("A Nanny In Manhattan") and Urusei Yatsura ("Hello Tiger"). Joshi has also been involved with a number of other record labels throughout the years, namely Bella Union and One Little Indian.

Launch 
In 1997, Rocket Girl's first release was a split single by the band Silver Apples ("I have known Love") and Windy & Carl ("Fractal Flow"). The label continued to grow with a diverse roster and encouraged cross-pollination between its artists, most notably the 1998 7" single collaboration between Low, Transient Waves and Piano Magic ("Sleep at the Bottom"). Hot on the heels of the Silver Apples & Windy & Carl's 7", 1998 also saw the release of Rocket Girl's first full-length album, A Tribute to Spacemen 3, which was a celebration of the pioneers of drone, with offerings from Bowery Electric, Mogwai, Arab Strap, Piano Magic and Low, among others. In 2000, Rocket Girl released the EP Add N to Fu(x)a. Just four years after its launch, Rocket Girl was credited for the launch of "intriguing lo-fi classics". Late in 2010 the label signed the London-based band Drugstore.

Awards 
In 2001, Rocket Girl enjoyed television exposure being the focus of an entire episode of the BBC series Hit & Miss – An A-Z of the music industry. In the same year, the label won a Young Music Professional Award. In August 2013, the Association of Independent Music nominated Rocket Girl for the 'Best Small Label' award.

Offshoot labels 
Rocket Girl has established a number of offshoot labels, including Indus Sonica, which reissued Piano Magic's seminal debut Popular Mechanics, and Mandita. Both labels remain under the Rocket Girl banner.

Artists

Discography

References

External links
 Official Website
 Official Facebook Page

 
British independent record labels